The Secret of Shambhala: In Search of the Eleventh Insight is the third book in The Celestine Prophecy series by James Redfield.

Plot summary 
The novel is set in the mountains of Tibet in search of the mythical place called Shambhala (also known as Shangri-La), accessible only by raising one's spiritual attunement to a high enough level. Among other things, the book touches on the concept of prayer energy and heaven and earth coming together. The concept can be experienced universally, when each of us raises this love.

Characters 
John 

The main character. John goes this time to Tibet, as his friends Wil and Natalie told him to do. Wil is gone when John arrives in Tibet.BillNatalie's father. Has helped John with some gardening.
 NatalieBill's daughter, who sets John out on his journey through Tibet.Wilson James (Wil)A steadfast character in The Celestine Prophecy, and in The Tenth Insight: Holding the Vision. Located in Shambhala.Yin DoloeWil sent Yin to meet John as he goes to Tibet. Yin has a deep hate for the Military of the Republic of China. He is with John throughout most of his journey.JampaA friend of Yin's. Jampa is a monk at the monastery where Lama Rigden lives, and has followed Lama Rigden for over 10 years.Lama RigdenThe protagonists visit him for more information about the whereabouts of Wil. He understands the legends of Shambhala more than anyone else.HanhHe helps John concentrate on what he eats.Colonel ChangThe one who wishes to destroy Shambhala.AniThe first human John meets after coming to Shambhala.PemaInitially about to give birth to a baby child; but the child is gone.TashiAni's son. He wants to enter John's world.Dorjee'''
Pema's husband.

Locations 
 Kunlun Mountains
 Kathmandu
 Hotel Himalaya, Kathmandu
 Lhasa
 Potala Palace, Lhasa
 Shigatse
 Tingri
 Saka
 Zhongba
 Paryang
 Dormar
 Mayun
 Hor Qu
 Lake Manasarovar
 Mount Kailash
 Ali
 Darchen
 Shambhala

1999 American novels
Visionary fiction
Sequel novels
Novels set in Tibet
Warner Books books